Gordon R. Parker is a business executive notable for leading the Gold Fields unit of Toronto, Ontario, Canada-based Iamgold corporation. He was chairman of Newmont Mining Corporation which was a firm involved with exploring, acquiring, and managing gold metals. Parker is a director at corporations including Caterpillar; Gold Fields Limited and Phelps Dodge Corporation. Mr. Parker has been a director of Caterpillar since 1995. In 1988, when Parker was chairman and chief executive officer of Newmont Corporation, he was 52 years old.

References

Living people
Year of birth missing (living people)